The Corrosive and Explosive Substances and Offensive Weapons Act 1958, is a Malaysian laws which enacted to provide certain penalties relating to the unlawful possession of corrosive and explosive substances and the carrying of offensive weapons.

Structure
The Corrosive and Explosive Substances and Offensive Weapons Act 1958, in its current form (1 October 2014), consists of 12 sections and 2 schedules (including 9 amendments), without separate Part.
 Section 1: Short title and application
 Section 2: Interpretation
 Section 3: Possession of corrosive or explosive substance for the purpose of causing hurt
 Section 4: Using a corrosive or explosive substance or offensive weapon
 Section 5: Consorting with person carrying corrosive or explosive substance
 Section 6: Carrying offensive weapons in public weapons
 Section 7: Offences relating to scheduled weapons
 Section 8: Consorting with persons carrying offensive weapons in public places
 Section 9: Power of search and seizure
 Section 10: Disposal of property
 Section 11: Presumptions
 Section 12: Power to amend Schedule
 Schedules

References

External links
 Corrosive and Explosive Substances and Offensive Weapons Act 1958 

1958 in Malayan law
Malaysian federal legislation